Portland Hills is a subdivision in Dartmouth Nova Scotia that is part of the Halifax Regional Municipality. It is located east of Morris Lake and Portland Estates. It formed in 2001-2008 as an extension of the community of Portland Estates along Portland Street (Route 207). The neighbourhood is home to the Portland Hills Centre, which includes Irish themed pub, Finbars. Running through Portland Hills is Birches Park, which includes the Portland Hills Greenway 2.2 kilometre trail.

Geography

Transportation

Portland Hills Terminal, at the corner of Portland Street and Portland Hills Drive, is a hub for Halifax Transit bus services.

Schools
 Elementary (grades primary to 6) - Portland Estates Elementary School
 Junior High (grades 7-9) -- Ellenvale Junior High School
 High Schools (grades 10-12)
 English, with optional International Baccalaureate (IB) Diploma program - Prince Andrew High School
 French Immersion - Dartmouth High School
 French Immersion International Baccalaureate - Cole Harbour District High School

References

Communities in Halifax, Nova Scotia
Dartmouth, Nova Scotia